The notion of a fibration generalizes the notion of a fiber bundle and plays an important role in algebraic topology, a branch of mathematics.

Fibrations are used, for example, in Postnikov systems or obstruction theory.

In this article, all mappings are continuous mappings between topological spaces.

Formal definitions

Homotopy lifting property 
A mapping  satisfies the homotopy lifting property for a space  if:

 for every homotopy  and
 for every mapping (also called lift)  lifting  (i.e. )

there exists a (not necessarily unique) homotopy  lifting  (i.e. ) with 

The following commutative diagram shows the situation:

Fibration 
A fibration (also called Hurewicz fibration) is a mapping  satisfying the homotopy lifting property for all spaces  The space  is called base space and the space  is called total space.

Serre fibration 
A Serre fibration (also called weak fibration) is a mapping  satisfying the homotopy lifting property for all CW-complexes.

Every Hurewicz fibration is a Serre fibration.

Quasifibration 
A mapping  is called quasifibration, if for every   and  holds that the induced mapping  is an isomorphism.

Every Serre fibration is a quasifibration.

Examples 

 The projection onto the first factor  is a fibration. That is, trivial bundles are fibrations.
 Every covering  satisfies the homotopy lifting property for all spaces. Specifically, for every homotopy  and every lift  there exists a uniquely defined lift  with 
 Every fiber bundle  satisfies the homotopy lifting property for every CW-complex.
 A fiber bundle with a paracompact and Hausdorff base space satisfies the homotopy lifting property for all spaces.
 The Hopf fibration  is a non trivial fiber bundle and specifically a Serre fibration.

Basic concepts

Fiber homotopy equivalence 

Pullback fibration 
Given a fibration  and a mapping , the mapping  is a fibration, where  is the pullback and the projections of  onto  and  yield the following commutative diagram:

The fibration  is called the pullback fibration or induced fibration.

Pathspace fibration 
With the pathspace construction, any continuous mapping can be extended to a fibration by enlarging its domain to a homotopy equivalent space. This fibration is called pathspace fibration.

The space  carries the subspace topology of  where  describes the space of all mappings  and carries the compact-open topology.

For the special case of the inclusion of the base point , an important example of the pathspace fibration emerges. The pathspace fibration  maps each path to its endpoint, hence the fiber  consists of all closed paths.

Properties 

 If the base space  is contractible, then the fibration  is fiber homotopy equivalent to the product fibration 
 The pathspace fibration of a fibration  is very similar to itself. More precisely, the inclusion  is a fiber homotopy equivalence.
 For a fibration  with fiber  and contractible total space, there is a weak homotopy equivalence

Puppe sequence 
For a fibration  with fiber  and base point  the inclusion  of the fiber into the homotopy fiber is a homotopy equivalence. Specifically it is the pullback fibration of the pathspace fibration . This procedure can now be applied again to the fibration  and so on. The inclusion  is a homotopy equivalence and iteration yields the sequence:Due to the duality of fibration and cofibration, there also exists a sequence of cofibrations. These two sequences are known as the Puppe sequences or the sequences of fibrations and cofibrations.

Principal fibration 
A fibration  with fiber  is called principal, if there exists a commutative diagram:

The bottom row is a sequence of fibrations and the vertical mappings are weak homotopy equivalences. Principal fibrations play an important role in Postnikov towers.

Long exact sequence of homotopy groups 
For a Serre fibration  there exists a long exact sequence of homotopy groups.

Hopf fibration 
Hopf fibrations are a family of fiber bundles whose fiber, total space and base space are spheres:The long exact sequence of homotopy groups of the hopf fibration  yields: 

Further the short exact sequences split and there are families of isomorphisms: and

Spectral sequence 
Spectral sequences are important tools in algebraic topology for computing (co-)homology groups.

The Leray-Serre spectral sequence connects the (co-)homology of the total space and the fiber with the (co-)homology of the base space of a fibration. For a fibration  with fiber  where the base space is a path connected CW-complex, and an additive homology theory  there exists a spectral sequence:

Fibrations do not yield long exact sequences in homology, as they do in homotopy. But under certain conditions, fibrations provide exact sequences in homology.

Orientability 

A fibration is called orientable over  if for any closed path  in  the following holds:

Euler characteristic 
For an orientable fibration  over the field  with fiber  and path connected base space, the Euler characteristic of the total space is given by:Here the Euler characteristics of the base space and the fiber are defined over the field .

See also 
Approximate fibration

References 

 
 
 
 
 
 
 
 

Algebraic topology
Topological spaces